Campbell House, or The Campbell House or variations, may refer to:

in Canada
 Campbell House (Toronto, Canada)

in the United States
(sorted by state, then city/town)
Campbell House (Palmer, Alaska), in Matanuska-Susitna Borough, listed on the National Register of Historic Places (NRHP)
Campbell-Chrisp House, Bald Knob, Arkansas, NRHP-listed
Wilson-Pittman-Campbell-Gregory House, Fayetteville, Arkansas, in Washington County, NRHP-listed
Campbell House (Forrest City, Arkansas), in St. Francis County, NRHP-listed
Campbell House (Rogers, Arkansas), in Benton County, NRHP-listed
Campbell House (Denver, Colorado), a Denver Landmark
Campbell House (Okahumpka, Florida), NRHP-listed
Campbell-Jordan House, Washington, Georgia, NRHP-listed
Albert Campbell House, Highland Park, Illinois, listed on the NRHP in Lake County
Leander Campbell House, Danville, Indiana, in Hendricks County, NRHP-listed
Henry F. Campbell Mansion, Indianapolis, Indiana, in Marion County, NRHP-listed
B. H. Campbell House, Wichita, Kansas, listed on the NRHP in Sedgwick County
Campbell House (Hopkinsville, Kentucky), listed on the NRHP in Christian County
Campbell House (Lexington, Kentucky), or "The Campbell House", a historic hotel
Campbell House (Paint Lick, Kentucky), listed on the NRHP in Madison County
David C. Campbell House, Plum Springs, Kentucky, listed on the NRHP in Warren County
William Campbell House (Stamping Ground, Kentucky), NRHP-listed
Sheriff Eugene P. Campbell House, Vidalia, Louisiana, listed on the NRHP in Concordia Parish
David W. Campbell House, Cherryfield, Maine, in Washington County, NRHP-listed
Frank Campbell House, Cherryfield, Maine, in Washington County, Maine, NRHP-listed
Gen. Alexander Campbell House, Cherryfield, Maine, NRHP-listed
Col. Samuel Campbell House, Cherryfield, Maine, in Washington County, Maine, NRHP-listed
Collen C. Campbell House, Barnstable, Massachusetts, NRHP-listed
Calvin A. and Alta Koch Campbell House, Midland, Michigan, in Midland County, NRHP-listed
Ticknor-Campbell House, Ann Arbor, Michigan, in Washtenaw County, NRHP-listed
William H. and Alma Downer Campbell House, Wabasha, Minnesota, in Wabasha County, NRHP-listed
Overfelt-Campbell-Johnston House, Independence, Missouri, listed on the NRHP in Atchison County
Thompson-Campbell Farmstead, Langdon, Missouri, in Atchison County, NRHP-listed
Campbell House Museum, St. Louis, Missouri, listed as the "Robert G. Campbell House" on the NRHP
Campbell-Christie House, River Edge, New Jersey, NRHP-listed
Campbell-Rumsey House, Bath, New York, NRHP-listed
Campbell-Whittlesey House, Rochester, New York, NRHP-listed
Dr. Cornelius Nase Campbell House, Stanfordville, New York, NRHP-listed
Harriet Campbell-Taylor House, Westfield, New York, NRHP-listed
James Archibald Campbell House, Buies Creek, North Carolina, in Harnett County, NRHP-listed
Morrison-Campbell House, Harmony, North Carolina, in Iredell County, NRHP-listed
Perciphull Campbell House, Union Grove, North Carolina, in Iredell County, NRHP-listed
Thomas D. Campbell House, Grand Forks, North Dakota, NRHP-listed
Johnson-Campbell House, Columbus, Ohio, NRHP-listed
Hugh Campbell House, Harrison, Ohio, NRHP-listed
Richard Posey Campbell House, Ashland, Oregon, listed on the NRHP in Jackson County
Hamilton Campbell House, Jefferson, Oregon, listed on the NRHP in Marion County
McDougall–Campbell House, Portland, Oregon, NRHP-listed
Robert E. Campbell House, Springfield, Oregon, NRHP-listed
Stephenson-Campbell House, Cecil, Pennsylvania, NRHP-listed
Gina Smith Campbell Bathhouse, Dell Rapids, South Dakota, listed on the NRHP in Minnehaha County
Gen. Charles T. Campbell House, Scotland, South Dakota, listed on the NRHP in Bon Homme County
Joseph A. Campbell House, Collierville, Tennessee, listed on the NRHP in Shelby County
William S. Campbell House, Franklin, Tennessee, NRHP-listed
Bowen-Campbell House, Goodlettsville, Tennessee, NRHP-listed
Dr. John Owen Campbell House, Lebanon, Tennessee, in Wilson County, NRHP-listed
Alexander-Campbell House, Abilene, Texas, listed on the NRHP in Taylor County
William Campbell House (Park City, Utah), in Summit County, NRHP-listed
Campbell House (Lexington, Virginia)
Campbell House (Spokane, Washington), NRHP-listed
Alexander Campbell Mansion, Bethany, West Virginia, NRHP-listed
Campbell-Hicks House, Huntington, West Virginia, NRHP-listed
Clarence Campbell House, Union, West Virginia, NRHP-listed
John G. Campbell House, Oconto, Wisconsin, listed on the NRHP in Oconto County

See also
Campbell Farm (disambiguation)
William Campbell House (disambiguation)